

David Shapiro (November 21, 1933January 24, 2011) was an American comedian, specializing in comic imitations of famous political figures, most of whom were based on notable Americans, including former U.S. Presidents Lyndon B. Johnson and Richard Nixon, Vice Presidents Hubert Humphrey, Spiro Agnew, and Nelson Rockefeller, and Senator Bobby Kennedy, as well as film celebrities, e.g., George C. Scott, Henry Fonda, Kirk Douglas, Robert Mitchum, Jack Nicholson, Jack Palance and Rod Steiger, and media figures, e.g., William F. Buckley Jr. and Larry King.

However, as eerily accurate and subtle as his impersonations were, the comedic narratives spoken by those depicted by Frye were outrageously à propos as well as politically savvy and au courant. For example, in one narrative, Frye had newly elected Nixon and his wife visit the White House just prior to assuming residency there in 1969. The incumbent Johnson answers the doorbell, oblivious as to the identity of his unannounced visitors, misidentifying them even after introductions have been made:

Another, from a February 1971 appearance on NBC's Kraft Music Hall, had him appearing in two segments. In the first, he portrayed Humphrey as a drug store owner (harkening back to Humphrey's original vocation) being interviewed by show host Eddy Arnold. The latter segment had Frye impersonating Nixon, William F. Buckley, Jr., George Jessel, Truman Capote and Liberace at a Valentine's Day party. Frye often keyed off President Nixon's own catchphrases ("Let me make one thing perfectly clear", or Kennedy's ("Let me say this about that".)

In 1973, Frye's album, Richard Nixon: A Fantasy, which dealt with Nixon's Watergate troubles, developed marketing problems when all three network affiliates in New York City (WNBC-TV, WABC-TV and WCBS-TV) rejected commercials promoting the album, citing questions of taste. In addition, the Woolworth's department store chain decided not to stock the record because, in their words, "some of our customers might be offended."

Although his heyday was in the 1960s and early 1970s, when his Nixon and Lyndon B. Johnson impersonations were definitive, Frye continued to create masterful new impressions and evolve old ones. His 1998 album Clinton: An Oral History featured riffs on Bill Clinton, Al Gore, Pat Buchanan, and John McLaughlin, plus that of an older Nixon (complete with pauses and phrasing more typical of the ex-President as he sounded in the 1980s and 1990s).

Death
David Frye died on January 24, 2011, at his home in Las Vegas, Nevada of cardiopulmonary arrest according to the Clark County Coroner.

Discography
As featured artist:

Clinton: An Oral History (1998)
Frye Is Nixon (1996)
David Frye Presents The Great Debate (1980)
Richard Nixon: A Fantasy (1973)
Richard Nixon Superstar (1971)
Radio Free Nixon (1971) (re-released in compilation 2006)
I Am The President (1969) (re-released in compilation 2006)

As player:

Bob Booker & George Foster Present The New First Family, 1968: A Futuristic Fairy Tale (1966)

Impersonated public figures

Spiro Agnew
Muhammad Ali
John B. Anderson
Humphrey Bogart
Marlon Brando
David Brinkley
Tom Brokaw
Pat Buchanan
William F. Buckley, Jr.
Raymond Burr
Richard Burton
George H. W. Bush
George W. Bush
James Cagney
James Callaghan
Truman Capote
Al Capp
Jimmy Carter
Dick Cheney
Jean Chrétien
Bill Clinton
Howard Cosell
Walter Cronkite
Richard J. Daley
Sammy Davis, Jr.

Bob Dole
Kirk Douglas
Michael Dukakis
Dwight D. Eisenhower
Gerald Ford
William Fulbright
Henry Fonda
Al Gore
Billy Graham
Edward Heath
Hubert Humphrey
Wolfman Jack
Jesse Jackson
Peter Jennings
George Jessel
Lyndon Johnson
Boris Karloff
Bobby Kennedy
John F. Kennedy
Ted Kennedy
Larry King
Henry Kissinger
James Mason
George McGovern
John McLaughlin

Robert Mitchum
Walter Mondale
Brian Mulroney
Ed Muskie
Jack Nicholson
Richard Nixon
Jack Palance
Lester B. Pearson
Gregory Peck
Ross Perot
Dan Quayle
Dan Rather
Ronald Reagan
Don Rickles
Pat Robertson
Nelson Rockefeller
George C. Scott
O. J. Simpson
Rod Steiger
David Susskind
Jimmy Swaggart
Pierre Trudeau
George Wallace
Harold Wilson
Walter Winchell

References

External links

Extensive history from liner notes of the recording I Am the President/Radio Free Nixon

1933 births
2011 deaths
American stand-up comedians
American impressionists (entertainers)
Comedians from New York (state)